The Four Winds is a combination commercial and luxury apartment building in the Central Business District of New Orleans, Louisiana, developed by Kailas Companies. The building rises 270 feet (90 m). It contains 19 floors, and was completed in 1927. In 2015, after significant renovations, the building was reopened with its original facade to match Emile Weil's original stylings. The Four Winds currently stands as the 34th-tallest building in the city.

See also
 List of tallest buildings in New Orleans
 Buildings and architecture of New Orleans

References

External links
 Official site

Skyscraper office buildings in New Orleans
Residential skyscrapers in New Orleans